Vermont Lady Voltage was a professional American women’s soccer team, founded in 2005, which is a member of the United Soccer Leagues W-League. Voltage played in the Northern Division of the Central Conference. They play their home games at the Collins-Perley Sports Complex in the city of St. Albans, Vermont, 27 miles north of the state's largest city, Burlington. The team's colors are black and white, and gold and blue. The team was a sister organization of the men's Vermont Voltage team, which plays in the USL Premier Development League.

The team folded after the 2008 season.

Notable former players
 Kristin Luckenbill
  Michelle Barr
  Karen Burke

Year-by-year

External links
Vermont Voltage

Women's soccer clubs in Vermont
Defunct USL W-League (1995–2015) teams
2005 establishments in Vermont
2008 disestablishments in Vermont
Defunct soccer clubs in Vermont
Association football clubs established in 2005
Association football clubs disestablished in 2008